The 1980–81 NBA season was the Bucks 13th season in the NBA. They finished with 60 wins and 22 losses, placing first in their division and second in the Eastern Conference behind the Boston Celtics. It was the Bucks' best regular season record since 1972–73, and their only 60-win season without Kareem Abdul-Jabbar on their roster until the 2018-19 season. The team's top scorer, fourth-year small forward Marques Johnson finished sixth the MVP voting.

Draft picks

Roster

Regular season

Season standings

Notes
 z, y – division champions
 x – clinched playoff spot

Record vs. opponents

Game log

|-style="background:#bbffbb;"
| 1 || October 10, 1980 || @ Philadelphia
| W 106–103
|Junior Bridgeman (21)
|
|
| The Spectrum
| 1–0
|-style="background:#fcc;"
| 2 || October 11, 1980 || @ New York
| L 109–114
|Marques Johnson (19)
|
|
| Madison Square Garden
| 1-1
|-style="background:#fcc;"
| 3 || October 16, 1980 || Boston
| L 103–110
|Marques Johnson (27)
|
|
| MECCA Arena
| 1–2
|-style="background:#bbffbb;"
| 4 || October 18, 1980 || @ Cleveland
| W 107–105
|Brian Winters (25)
|
|
| Coliseum at Richfield
| 2-2
|-style="background:#bbffbb;"
| 5 || October 19, 1980 || New Jersey
| W 105–93
|Brian Winters (22)
|
|
| MECCA Arena
| 3–2
|-style="background:#bbffbb;"
| 6 || October 21, 1980 || Cleveland
| W 115–95
|Marques Johnson (28)
|
|
| MECCA Arena
| 4–2
|-style="background:#bbffbb;"
| 7 || October 22, 1980 || @ Indiana
| W 119–105
|
|
|
| Market Square Arena
| 5-2
|-style="background:#bbffbb;"
| 8 || October 25, 1980 || Chicago
| W 109–93
|Marques Johnson (21)
|
|
| MECCA Arena
| 6–2
|-style="background:#bbffbb;"
| 8 || October 26, 1980 || Washington
| W 111–88
|Marques Johnson (21)
|Marques Johnson, Sidney Moncrief (9)
|Quinn Buckner, Brian Winters (7)
| MECCA Arena
| 7–2
|-style="background:#bbffbb;"
| 9 || October 28, 1980 || @ Chicago
| W 106–99
|
|
|
| Chicago Stadium
| 8–2
|-style="background:#bbffbb;"
| 10 || October 29, 1980 || @ New Jersey
| W 132–116
|Junior Bridgeman (26)
|
|
| Rutgers Athletic Center
| 9–2

|-style="background:#bbffbb;"
| 11 || November 1, 1980 || @ Atlanta
| W 99–93
|
|
|
| Omni Coliseum
| 10–2
|-style="background:#bbffbb;"
| 12 || November 2, 1980 || Indiana
| W 135–121
|Marques Johnson (40)
|
|
| MECCA Arena
| 11–2
|-style="background:#fcc;"
| 13 || November 4, 1980 || Detroit
| L 96–98
|
|
|
| MECCA Arena
| 11–3
|-style="background:#bbffbb;"
| 14 || November 7, 1980 || @ Boston
| w 102–101
|
|
|
| Boston Garden
| 12–3
|-style="background:#fcc;"
| 15 || November 9, 1980 || Philadelphia
| L 121–136
|
|
|
| MECCA Arena
| 12–4
|-style="background:#bbffbb;"
| 16 || November 11, 1980 || @ Cleveland
| W 100–96
|Marques Johnson (19)
|
|
| Coliseum at Richfield
| 13–4
|-style="background:#bbffbb;"
| 17 || November 12, 1980 || @ Detroit
| W 122–98
|Junior Bridgeman (27)
|
|
| Pontiac Silverdome
| 14–4
|-style="background:#bbffbb;"
| 18 || November 14, 1980 || New York
| W 125–106
|
|
|
| MECCA Arena
| 15–4
|-style="background:#fcc;"
| 19 || November 16, 1980 || Chicago
| L 108–114
|
|
|
| MECCA Arena
| 15–5
|-style="background:#bbffbb;"
| 20 || November 18, 1980 || @ Utah
| W 126–93
|Sidney Moncrief (21)
|
|
| Salt Palace
| 16–5
|-style="background:#bbffbb;"
| 21 || November 20, 1980 || @ Portland
| W 97–93
|Mickey Johnson (22)
|
|
| Memorial Coliseum
| 17–5
|-style="background:#bbffbb;"
| 22 || November 23, 1980 || @ Los Angeles
| W 110–94
|Marques Johnson (24)
|
|
| The Forum
| 18–5
|-style="background:#bbffbb;"
| 23 || November 28, 1980 || Atlanta
| W 114–108 OT
|
|
|
| MECCA Arena
| 19–5
|-style="background:#fcc;"
| 24 || November 29, 1980 || @ Washington
| L 89–98
|
|
|
| Capital Centre
| 19–6
|-style="background:#bbffbb;"
| 25 || November 30, 1980 || Boston
| W 107–105
|
|
|
| MECCA Arena
| 20–6

|-style="background:#bbffbb;"
| 27 || December 2, 1980 || Utah
| W 119–108
|
|
|
| MECCA Arena
| 21–6
|-style="background:#bbffbb;"
| 28 || December 5, 1980 || Indiana
| W 102–100
|
|
|
| MECCA Arena
| 22–6
|-style="background:#fcc;"
| 29 || December 6, 1980 || @ New York
| L 94–104
|
|
|
| Madison Square Garden
| 22-7
|-style="background:#fcc;"
| 30 || December 9, 1980 || @ Boston
| L 89–112
|
|
|
| Boston Garden
| 22-8
|-style="background:#bbffbb;"
| 31 || December 11, 1980 || New York
| W 119–107
|
|
|
| MECCA Arena
| 23-8
|-style="background:#fcc;"
| 32 || December 13, 1980 || @ Atlanta
| L 119–122
|
|
|
| Omni Coliseum
| 23-9
|-style="background:#bbffbb;"
| 33 || December 14, 1980 || San Antonio
| W 115–98
|
|
|
| MECCA Arena
| 24-9
|-style="background:#fcc;"
| 34 || December 17, 1980 || @ New Jersey
| L 112–115
|
|
|
| Rutgers Athletic Center
| 24-10
|-style="background:#bbffbb;"
| 35 || December 18, 1980 || Detroit
| W 121–104
|
|
|
| MECCA Arena
| 25–10
|-style="background:#bbffbb;"
| 37 || December 21, 1980 || Houston
| W 123–91
|
|
|
| MECCA Arena
| 26–11
|-style="background:#bbffbb;"
| 38 || December 27, 1980 || Dallas
| W 112–96
|
|
|
| MECCA Arena
| 27–11

|-style="background:#bbffbb;"
| 40 || January 4, 1980 || San Diego
| W 128–95
|
|
|
| MECCA Arena
| 29–11
|-style="background:#bbffbb;"
| 41 || January 6, 1980 || New Jersey
| W 102–86
|
|
|
| MECCA Arena
| 30–11
|-style="background:#bbffbb;"
| 42 || January 8, 1980 || Atlanta
| W 98–95
|
|
|
| MECCA Arena
| 31–11

|-style="background:#bbffbb;"
| 62 || February 17, 1981 || @ Dallas
| W 114–106
|
|
|
| Reunion Arena
| 45–17

Playoffs

|- align="center" bgcolor="#ffcccc"
| 1
| April 5
| @ Philadelphia
| L 122–125
| Junior Bridgeman (32)
| Marques Johnson (14)
| Quinn Buckner (8)
| Spectrum9,727
| 0–1
|- align="center" bgcolor="#ccffcc"
| 2
| April 7
| @ Philadelphia
| W 109–99
| Marques Johnson (22)
| Bob Lanier (10)
| Quinn Buckner (6)
| Spectrum15,259
| 1–1
|- align="center" bgcolor="#ffcccc"
| 3
| April 10
| Philadelphia
| L 103–108
| Marques Johnson (29)
| Marques Johnson (9)
| Marques Johnson (8)
| MECCA Arena11,052
| 1–2
|- align="center" bgcolor="#ccffcc"
| 4
| April 12
| Philadelphia
| W 109–98
| Marques Johnson (35)
| Sidney Moncrief (10)
| Marques Johnson (7)
| MECCA Arena11,052
| 2–2
|- align="center" bgcolor="#ffcccc"
| 5
| April 15
| @ Philadelphia
| L 99–116
| Mickey Johnson, Moncrief (20)
| Mickey Johnson (13)
| Marques Johnson (7)
| Spectrum15,384
| 2–3
|- align="center" bgcolor="#ccffcc"
| 6
| April 17
| Philadelphia
| W 109–86
| Mickey Johnson (22)
| Mickey Johnson (12)
| Lanier, Buckner (6)
| MECCA Arena11,052
| 3–3
|- align="center" bgcolor="#ffcccc"
| 7
| April 19
| @ Philadelphia
| L 98–99
| Marques Johnson (36)
| Bob Lanier (10)
| four players tied (4)
| Spectrum6,704
| 3–4
|-

Player statistics

Season

Playoffs

Awards, records and milestones

Awards

Week/Month

All-Star

Season
 Marques Johnson, All-NBA Second Team
 Quinn Buckner, NBA All-Defensive Second Team

Records

Milestones

Transactions

Trades

Free Agents

References

See also
 1980-81 NBA season

Milwaukee Bucks seasons
Mil
Milwaukee Bucks
Milwaukee Bucks